The Motrice Pia was an early three-wheeled vehicle, introduced by Italian Enrico Bernardi, and credited as the first motorcycle by sources such as the Enciclopedia Italiana di Scienze, Lettere ed Arti. The exact year of introduction depends on which one of the following milestones one considers: the demonstration of a gasoline engine in 1882–1884 (first used to power a sewing machine), the application of the engine to a child's tricycle in 1884, the application of this engine to a motorized tricycle (or low cart) in 1893, or the mounting of the motor behind a bicycle on a one-wheel trailer via chain drive creating a "motorcycle" in 1894.

Specifications
Specifications in the box accompanying the article are from Museo Nicolis and refer to the 1884 tricycle.

References

See also
List of motorcycles of the 1890s

Motorcycles introduced in the 1890s
Motorcycles of Italy